Cuba Lake is a  reservoir in Allegany and Cattaraugus counties, New York.

Originally known as the Oil Creek Reservoir, Cuba Lake was created in 1858 to help maintain water levels on the Genesee Valley Canal. Cuba Lake and its surrounding land is owned by New York State, and was managed as the Cuba Reservation between 1912 and 2011. Today, cottage and home sites on the lake are officially leased from the state as part of the Cuba Lake District.

Cuba Lake is a regionally popular fishing and boating destination, with several sportfish and panfish species available.

Description
Cuba Lake is a reservoir located north of the village of Cuba, primarily within the town of Cuba in Allegany County, with a small portion extending into Cattaraugus County. The lake is fed by Rawson Creek at its northwest end, and drains south through the Cuba Lake Outlet, a tributary to Oil Creek.

History
Originally known as the Oil Creek Reservoir, Cuba Lake was constructed between 1852 and 1858 to serve as a feeder reservoir for the Genesee Valley Canal. The reservoir was impounded by a  dam built at a cost of $150,000. At the time, it was claimed as the largest artificial lake in New York State.

In 1878, the Genesee Valley Canal Railroad was completed, replacing the Genesee Valley Canal. The reservoir and a portion of the former canal were retained to help maintain water levels on the Erie Canal. Later, after New York State announced their intention to drain the reservoir, lobbying by former canal superintendent Charles Wyvelle led to the reservoir being saved.

Cuba Reservation

An act of the New York State Legislature established the Cuba Reservation (also known as the Cuba Lake Reservation) in 1912. In doing so, the legislature placed the reservoir and surrounding state lands under control of the New York State Conservation Commission (predecessor to today's Department of Environmental Conservation), who were charged with maintaining the reservoir and encouraging public recreational use of the area.

At the time of the reservation's establishment, Cuba Lake covered  and the state controlled an additional  of land surrounding the reservoir. Before being designated as a reservation, numerous vacation cottages had been erected by private individuals upon the state land. Although the occupiers of these cottages were effectively squatters, the Conservation Commission codified their use of the land by offering five-year leases of the properties (for a $15 annual fee), and established a number of guidelines for the land's use.

In 1928, control of Cuba Reservation was transferred to the newly created Allegany State Park Commission, which reported to the Conservation Department's Division of Parks. The duties of the Division of Parks would later be transferred to the New York State Office of Parks, Recreation and Historic Preservation, who managed the reservation until 2011. The reservoir and surrounding state property is held by the New York State Office of General Services as of 2015.

Cuba Lake District
In 1981, the Cuba Lake District was formed to aid in managing the needs of the lake and the surrounding cottages, many of which have been converted to permanent residences in recent years. The Cuba Lake District legally rents the land from New York State, and in turn collects lease fees from residents. It also works to organize maintenance activities on the reservoir and dam, publicize safety bulletins, and develop and enforce regulations.

Recreation
Cuba Lake is a popular regional destination for boating and fishing. Public access to the lake is permitted through a state-managed boat launch located near Rawson Creek's inlet on West Shore Road. Ice fishing access is possible from South Shore Road near the dam. Sportfish species found in Cuba Lake include walleye, smallmouth bass, largemouth bass, northern pike, common carp, yellow perch, rock bass, bluegill, pumpkinseed, brown bullhead, and black crappie.

References

External links
Cuba Lake District

Reservoirs in New York (state)
Reservoirs in Allegany County, New York
Reservoirs in Cattaraugus County, New York
Protected areas of Allegany County, New York
Protected areas of Cattaraugus County, New York
1858 establishments in New York (state)